Professor Dr. Saiful Islam is a Bangladeshi academic. He served as the 13th vice-chancellor of Bangladesh University of Engineering and Technology (BUET).

Education
Islam earned his bachelor's and master's in electrical engineering from BUET in 1975 and 1977 respectively. He obtained his Ph.D. degree from Cambridge University in 1986.

Career
Saiful started his teaching career as a lecturer of the Department of Electrical Engineering of BUET in May 1975. He became a professor in 1988. He served as the dean of the Faculty of Electrical and Electronic Engineering during 1995–1997. On 22 June 2016, Islam was selected as the 13th vice-chancellor of BUET. The post was vacant since Khaleda Ekram had died on 24 May 2016.

From August 2013 until June 2016, Islam worked as the pro-vice-chancellor of Primeasia University, a private university in Dhaka, after he was appointed by the President of Bangladesh.

Awards
 Gold Medal by Bangladesh Academy of Sciences (1988)

Controversy
Following the murder of Abrar Fahad, a second year EEE student and resident at the Sher-e-Bangla Hall of BUET, on 7 October 2019, massive protest spread all over the university campus. But Islam didn't show up after the murder incident, resulting in tremendous criticism throughout the country. Prime Minister also criticized him for his absence. Later on 9 October 2019 he went to visit victim Abrar's home at Kushtia, where he met immense public protest and couldn't enter his home. The Teachers' Association of BUET and Alumni Association of BUET demanded his resignation as vice-chancellor due to his failure.

References

Living people
Bangladesh University of Engineering and Technology alumni
Alumni of the University of Cambridge
Academic staff of Bangladesh University of Engineering and Technology
Vice-Chancellors of Bangladesh University of Engineering and Technology
Year of birth missing (living people)
Place of birth missing (living people)